Corynoneura is a speciose genus of non-biting midges in the subfamily Orthocladiinae of the bloodworm family Chironomidae. With a world-wide distribution (absent from Antarctica), these small midges are found in both flowing and standing freshwater of various thermal regimes.

Species
C. arctica Kieffer, 1923
C. brundini Hirvenoja & Hirvenoja, 1988
C. carriana Edwards, 1924
C. celeripes Winnertz, 1852
C. celtica Edwards, 1924
C. coronata Edwards, 1924
C. diara Roback, 1957
C. edwardsi Brundin, 1949
C. fittkaui Schlee, 1968
C. fortispicula Weidenburg & Trivinho-Strixino, 2011
C. gratias Schlee, 1968
C. gynocera Tuiskunen, 1983
C. hermanni Weidenburg & Trivinho-Strixino, 2011
C. lacustris Edwards, 1924
C. lobata Edwards, 1924
C. longipennis Tokunaga, 1936
C. magna Brundin, 1949
C. marina Kieffer, 1924
C. mediaspicula Weidenburg & Trivinho-Strixino, 2011
C. mineira Weidenburg & Trivinho-Strixino, 2011
C. oxfordana Boesel and Winner, 1980
C. scutellata Winnertz, 1846
C. septadentata Weidenburg & Trivinho-Strixino, 2011
C. sertaodaquina Weidenburg & Trivinho-Strixino, 2011
C. taris Roback, 1957
C. unicapsulata Weidenburg & Trivinho-Strixino, 2011

References

Chironomidae
Nematocera genera